The office of Shadow Minister for Employment is a position on the United Kingdom's Official Opposition frontbench, and has occasionally been a position in the Shadow Cabinet.

From 1970 to 1995, the duty of the office holder was to scrutinise the actions of the government's Secretary of State for Employment and develop alternative policies. From 1995, the office shadowed the Secretary of State for Education and Employment. In 2001, the office was replaced by that of Shadow Secretary of State for Work and Pensions after the creation of the Department for Work and Pensions.

In 2019, the office was reformed in the Shadow Cabinet of Jeremy Corbyn as Shadow Minister for Labour; later renamed Secretary of State for Employment Rights and, in the Shadow Cabinet of Keir Starmer, Shadow Secretary of State for Employment Rights and Protections. The position was vacant after the resignation of Andy McDonald, who was replaced by Alison McGovern in the November 2021 reshuffle.

List of Shadow Secretaries for Employment 

Official Opposition (United Kingdom)
2021 disestablishments in the United Kingdom